This is a list of Iranian football transfers for the 2015 summer transfer window. Transfers of Iran Pro League and Azadegan League are listed. Transfer window was opened on June 2, 2015 and will be open until July 21, 2015 for players who played in Iranian clubs. On July 20, Iran League Organisation extends transfer window for players who played in Iranian clubs in season 2014–15 until 28 July 2015. Fifa TMS (for players who played in foreign clubs) was opened on May 30, 2015 and will be open until July 23, 2015.

Players limits

The Iranian Football Clubs who participate in 2015–16 Iranian football different levels are allowed to have up to maximum 35 players in their player lists, which will be categorized in the following groups:
 Up to maximum 18 adult (without any age limit) players
 Up to maximum 9 under-23 players (i.e. the player whose birth is after 1 January 1993).
 Up to maximum 8 under-21 players (i.e. the player whose birth is after 1 January 1995).

Iran Pro League

Rules and regulations 
According to Iran Football Federation rules for 2015–16 Iran Pro League, each Football Club is allowed to take up to maximum 6 new Iranian player from the other clubs who already played in the 2014–15 Iran Pro League season. In addition to these six new players, each club is allowed to take up to maximum 4 non-Iranian new players (at least one of them should be Asian) and up to 3 players from Free agent (who did not play in 2015–16 Iran Pro League season or doesn't list in any 2015–16 League after season's start) during the season. In addition to these players, the clubs are also able to take some new under-23 and under-21 years old players, if they have some free place in these categories in their player lists. Under-23 players should sign in transfer window but under-21 can be signed during the first mid-season. For the first time, in 2015–16 season clubs are allowed to sign Japanese player without foreign players (3+1) limit.

Esteghlal 
Head coach: Parviz Mazloumi 
Remaining Pro League quota: 0

In: 

Out:

Esteghlal Ahvaz 
Head coach:  Siavash Bakhtiarizadeh
Remaining Pro League quota: 0

In:

Out:

Esteghlal Khuzestan 
Head coach: Abdollah Veisi 
Remaining Pro League quota: 4 

In:

Out:

Foolad 
Head coach:  Dragan Skočić
Remaining Pro League quota: 0

In:

Out:

Gostaresh Foulad 
Head coach: Faraz Kamalvand 
Remaining Pro League quota: 1

In:

Out:

Malavan 
Head coach: Amir Ghalehnoei
Remaining Pro League quota: 4

In:

Out:

Naft Tehran 
Head coach: Alireza Mansourian
Remaining Pro League quota: 2

In:

Out:

Padideh 
Head coach: Mohammadreza Mohajeri
Remaining Pro League quota: 1

In:

Out:

Persepolis 
Head coach:  Branko Ivanković
Remaining Pro League quota: 1

In:

Out:

Rah Ahan 
Head coach: Mehdi Tartar
Remaining Pro League quota: 1

In:

Out:

Saba Qom 
Head coach: Ali Daei
Remaining Pro League quota: 0

In:

Out:

Saipa 
Head coach: Majid Jalali
Remaining Pro League quota: 5

In:

Out:

Sepahan 
Head coach: Hossein Faraki
Remaining Pro League quota: 4

In:

Out:

Siah Jamegan Khorasan 
Head coach: Rasoul Khatibi
Remaining Pro League quota: 0

In:

Out:

Tractor Sazi 
Head coach:  Toni
Remaining Pro League quota: 4

In:

Out:

Zob Ahan 
Head coach: Yahya Golmohammadi
Remaining Pro League quota: 3

In:

Out:

Notes
PL Pro League quota.

Azadegan League

Rules and regulations 
According to Iran Football Federation rules for 2015–16 Azadegan League each club is allowed to take up to 3 players from Free agent during the season. In addition to these players, the clubs are also able to take some new under-23 and under-21 years old players, if they have some free place in these categories in their player lists. Under-23 players should sign in transfer window but under-21 can be signed during the first mid-season. Clubs in Azadegan League Couldn't sign any foreign player. There is no limit for signing Iranian players.

Aluminium Arak 
Head coach: Gholamreza Delgarm

In:

Out:

Aluminium Hormozgan 
Head coach: Davoud Haghdoust

In:

Out:

Damash 
Head coach: Majid Jahanpour

In:

Out:

Fajr Sepasi 
Head coach: Ali Asghar Kalantari

In:

Out:

Foolad Yazd 
Head coach: Mohammad Reza Shirdel

In:

Out:

Giti Pasand Isfahan 
Head coach:  Vahik Torosian

In:

Out:

Gol Gohar Sirjan 
Head coach: Ghasem Shahba

In:

Out:

Iranjavan 
Head coach: Hamid Kolalifard

In:

Out:

Kheybar Khorramabad 
Head coach: Ali Nikbakht

In:

Out:

Khoneh Be Khoneh Mazandaran 
Head coach: Akbar Misaghian

In:

Out:

Machine Shahrdari Tabriz 
Head coach: Nader Dastneshan

In:

Out:

Mes Kerman 
Head coach:  Vingo Begovic

In:

Out:

Mes Rafsanjan 
Head coach:  Mišo Krstičević

In:

Out:

Naft Masjed Soleyman 
Head coach: Farzad Hafezi

In:

Out:

Nassaji 
Head coach:  Paulo Alves

In:

Out:

Parseh Tehran 
Head coach: Farshad Pious

In:

Out:

PAS Hamedan 
Head coach: Davoud Mahabadi

In:

Out:

Paykan 
Head coach: Alireza Marzban

In:

Out:

Sanat Naft 
Head coach:  Carlos Manuel

In:

Out:

Shahrdari Ardabil 
Head coach: Mohammad Rabiei

In:

Out:

See also
 List of Iranian football transfers winter 2013–14
 List of Iranian football transfers summer 2014
 List of Iranian football transfers winter 2014–15

Notes and references

Football transfers summer 2015
2014
Transfers